The Carnegie United Kingdom Trust is an independent, endowed charitable trust based in Scotland that operates throughout Great Britain and Ireland. Originally established with an endowment from Andrew Carnegie in his birthplace of Dunfermline, it is incorporated by a royal charter and shares purpose-built premises with the Carnegie Trust for the Universities of Scotland, the Carnegie Dunfermline Trust, and the Carnegie Hero Fund Trust.

History

The Carnegie United Kingdom Trust was founded in 1913 with a $10 million endowment from Andrew Carnegie. In creating the trust, Carnegie defined its purpose as:

The trust's endowment provided it with a yearly budget of £100,000, a very significant amount of money at the time, causing one commentator to observe that ‘how they spent this money was a matter of national importance’. While the trust had to spend some of its money on libraries and church organs already promised to several groups by the Carnegie Corporation of New York or Carnegie himself, the trust was largely free to choose which charitable causes it would give to.

In the 1910s and 1920s, the trust focused on fulfilling Carnegie's commitment to building libraries, as Carnegie himself had already done across the United States. The trust also funded the construction of several universities, including Carnegie College in Leeds, Newbattle Abbey College in Newbattle, and College Harlec in Harlech. Other contributions to the education field during this time period included funding the Workers Educational Association, supporting the first pre-school playgroups, and training social workers and librarians. In the 1930s it shifted its focus to social welfare, including the Land Settlement programme, which aimed to help unemployed men to make a living from the land. It also advocated for the creation of National Parks, subsequently introduced by the Attlee ministry after World War II. The Trust also supported the arts during this time, including the restoration of the Book of Kells in Ireland, the publication of ten volumes of Tudor church music, and the publication of contemporary British musical compositions as the Carnegie Collection of British Music. After World War II, the Trust expanded its social welfare programs and released reports about health and nutrition in the United Kingdom.

In 1996, the Trust launched The Carnegie Young People Initiative (CYPI), a youth programme designed to encourage young people to participate more positively in society. To support the goals of the CYPI, the Trust funded research, conferences, demonstration projects, training, networking, publications, and online initiatives. The Trust also advocated for issues affecting young people, such as giving 16-year-olds the right to vote. Trust staff members also acted as advisors to government departments, local authorities, the NHS, schools, and the voluntary sector. By the end of the program in 2007, CYPI provided £1.78 million of direct funding to 130 projects across the British Isles. Later that year, the Trust helped to secure £4m to create Participation Works, the national centre for youth empowerment in the United Kingdom. The Trust also co-funded the Carnegie Medal for Children's literature and organised a centenary festival for the first Carnegie library in 2007. In 2008, the Trust created the UK's first university based research centres for philanthropy and charitable giving in partnership with the UK and Scottish Governments and the Economic and Social Research Council. Soon after, the Trust's Royal Charter was changed to enable it to collaborate with foundations across the European Union. It became an active member of the European Foundations Centre and jointly funded youth empowerment and rural community development work as part of the Network of European Foundations. It also began to collaborate more closely with the Carnegie foundations in the United States and Europe.

Current activities
The remit of the Trust has been the same since it began in 1913, although the approach has changed over time. There was an increasing concern that the Trust's model of short-term funding, prevalent across the foundation world, had not been an effective way of addressing changing issues and needs. In 2004, Trustees decided to end the Trust's grant funding and to operate at a more strategic level in order to influence public policies and practice in more sustainable ways. One of the main reasons for this was the Trust's concern that the model of short-term, generally modest grant giving provided little evidence of sustainable change or impact upon deeper structural concerns in society. In relative terms the value of the endowment has also reduced significantly while the role of the state has increased, prompting a rethink of the role of the Trust. 
The Strategic Plan for 2016-2020 reconfirms that decision, outlining the role of the organisation as an operating Trust that makes proactive decisions about its projects and activities. The Trust no longer takes unsolicited grant applications, but seeks to build partnerships with other organisations for specific pieces of work.

In August 2021, Carnegie UK released their new Strategy for Change - Learning how to live well together.

Publications

About the Trust's work
Carnegie UK Strategy for Change - Learning how to live well together 
Current Work Leaflet 
Annual Review 2020 
Annual Report and Accounts for the year ended 31 December 2020

Key 2013 reports
Evidence Exchange 
Make Your Local News Work 
The Rise of the Enabling State 
Economic literacy training for UK-based journalists 
Economic literacy training for civil society organisations 
Shifting the Dial in Scotland 
Weathering the Storm 
Going the Last Mile 
Across the Divide

Key 2014 reports
Places that love people 
Making Digital Real 
The Welsh Dragon: The success of enterprise education in Wales 
Measuring What Matters in Northern Ireland

Key 2015 reports
Fairness Matters – report of the Fairer Fife Commission 
Click and Connect – hyperlocal news case studies 
The Enabling State Challenge – meet the winners 
Ambition and Opportunity – a national strategy for public libraries in Scotland 
Meeting the need for affordable credit 
The Carnegie Position on Enterprise 
Digital Participation in Dumfries and Kirkcaldy 
Finding and Protecting the Carnegie Playing Fields

Key 2016 reports
Work and Wellbeing: Discussion Paper 
Turnaround Towns 
Time for Towns 
Build your own TestTown Manual 
Digital Participation and Social Justice in Scotland 
Sharpening Our Focus 
The Enabling State in Practice: Evidence from Innovators 
Carnegie Library Lab: Final Project Snapshot from Cohort 1 
Interaction 
Gateway to Affordable Credit 
Breaking the Link 
Towards A Wellbeing Framework: One Year On

Key 2017 reports
Searching for Space: What place for towns in public policy? 
What Do Citizens Want? 
#NotWithoutMe 
Digitally Savvy Citizens 
The Place of Kindness 
Fairness Commissions: From Shetland to Southampton 
Shining a Light 
Hackathons: A Practical Guide 
The Scottish Approach to Evidence

Key 2018 reports
Leading the Way – a guide to privacy for public library staff 
Payday Denied: Exploring the lived experience of declined payday loan applicants 
Use of credit and financial resilience. Analysis of the Scottish Household Survey 
Repay Right 
Quantifying kindness, public engagement and place 
Making Procurement Work for All 
Digital Inclusion in Health and Care in Wales 
Kindness, emotions and human relationships: The blind spot in public policy 
Living Digitally – An evaluation of the CleverCogs digital care and support system 
Fulfilling Work in Ireland: Discussion Paper 
Growing Livelihoods People Working Together to Build a Future for Smaller-Scale Food Growers 
New Powers, New Deals: Remaking British Towns after Brexit 
Measuring Good Work: The final report of the Measuring Job Quality Working Group 
Insights For A Better Way 
Data for Public Benefit 
What Sort of Scotland Do You Want To Live In?

Key 2019 reports
Ensuring Good Future Jobs 
Turnaround Towns UK 
Participating People 
Support for Community Planning Partnerships’ Statements of Progress: Examples of visual communication of data 
The Enabling State: Where are we now? Review of policy developments 2013-2018 
The Practice of Kindness: Learning from KIN and North Ayrshire 
Study visit to Wales 
Engaging Libraries: Learning from Phase 1 
Conversations with young people about kindness 
Journeys of Understanding: Domestic twinning as an approach to improving town capacity and wellbeing 
Switched On 
The many shades of co-produced evidence 
Exploring the practicalities of a basic income pilot

Key 2020 reports
The courage to be kind 
Gross Domestic Wellbeing (GDWe): an alternative measure of social progress 
COVID-19 and Communities Listening Project: A Shared Response 
Race Inequality in the Workforce 
Good Work for Wellbeing in the Coronavirus Economy 
Learning from Lockdown: 12 Steps to Eliminate Digital Exclusion 
Making a Difference: Libraries, Lockdown and Looking Ahead 
Pooling Together: How Community Hubs have responded to the COVID-19 Emergency 
North Ayrshire: A case study on Kindness 
Fear and Loaning – The Impact of Covid-19 on affordable credit providers serving financially vulnerable customers 
Building Back for the Better: A perspective from CUKT 
The 10 per cent solution 
Talk of the Town: Supporting place based storytelling 
Community Asset Ownership in Towns: A cross-UK learning event 
Carnegie Library Lab: Reflections on a Programme for Public Libraries 2014 – 2020 
Carnegie Library Lab: Final Project Snapshot from Cohort 3 
The Future of the Minimum Wage: the Workers’ perspective 
Race Inequality in the Workforce 
Natural Capital Account for Derry City and Strabane District 
Race Inequality in the Workforce 
Natural Capital Account for Derry City and Strabane District 
Scaling up the UK personal lending CDFI sector: From £20m to £200m in lending by 2027 
Engage. Respond. Innovate. The Value of Hackathons in Public Libraries 
Can Good Work Solve the Productivity Puzzle?

Key 2021 reports
Working Together for Wellbeing: The report of the Northern Ireland Embedding Wellbeing in Local Government Programme 
Leading with kindness: A report on the learning from the Kindness Leadership Network 
GDWe 2019-20 Release 
Digitally Kind 
What Next for Fair Work in Scotland? 
Embedding a Wellbeing Framework in Northern Ireland

Key 2022 reports
GDWe: A spotlight on democratic wellbeing
The North of Tyne Combined Authority Inclusive Economy Board’s Wellbeing Framework for the North of Tyne
Rethinking Northern Ireland: Reports from a seminar series on wellbeing in Northern Ireland
The Online Safety Bill: Our initial analysis
National Performance Framework Next Steps

References

Further reading
 Robertson, William (1964) Welfare in Trust: A History of the Carnegie United Kingdom Trust 1913–1963. Edinburgh: T. and A. Constable Ltd.
 Goodenough, Simon (1985) The Greatest Good Fortune: Andrew Carnegie's Gift for Today. Edinburgh: MacDonald Publishers.
 Nasaw, David (2006) Andrew Carnegie. New York: The Penguin Press.

External links
 Official website
 

Andrew Carnegie
1913 establishments in Scotland
Dunfermline
Organisations based in Scotland with royal patronage
Charitable trusts
Charities based in Scotland